The large tortoiseshell or blackleg tortoiseshell (Nymphalis polychloros) is a butterfly of the family Nymphalidae.

Subspecies
Subspecies include:
 Nymphalis polychloros polychloros
 Nymphalis polychloros erythromelas (Austaut, 1885) – Algeria and Morocco

Distribution and habitat
The species is found in North Africa, southern and central Europe, Turkey, southern Russia, the central and southern Urals, Kazakhstan and the Himalayas. In Central Europe they occur in the warmer regions, but have become generally rare. By contrast, they are still common in the Mediterranean and Southern Alps. They live in sparse forests and their edges, on dry shrubbery and in orchards. It is an extreme rarity in Britain, although it used to be widespread throughout England and Wales. Most of the specimens seen in Britain are thought to be captive-bred releases. These butterflies mainly inhabit woodland, especially with sallows (willows). However, there are indications that the large tortoiseshell is recolonising southern England.

Description
These medium to large butterflies have orange to red wings with black and yellow patches. Both wings with yellowish submarginal lunules, upon which follows a black band which is likewise composed of lunules and bears on the hindwing small blue spots. The underside of the wings is smoky brown with darker shades and black transverse pencilling. There is no sexual dimorphism.
This species looks very similar to the small tortoiseshell (Aglais urticae), but it is more closely related to the Camberwell beauty and Nymphalis xanthomelas It differs from the small tortoiseshell by its larger size (45–62 mm. wingspan in Aglais urticae)  and by the more orange ground colour of the upper surface of its wings and the orange base of its hindwings. The forewing is orange-brown, with 3 costal black blotches, 3 large black spots in the disc posteriorly and a narrow blackish terminal band – less bright than those of A. urticae, and lacking the apical white spot and the marginal blue dots of that species. Compared to the yellow-legged tortoiseshell it has yellower interspaces between the black blotches on the costal edges of its forewings and the dark marginal band is narrower. The surest way to recognize it, however, is by its dark haired tarsi yellow-legged tortoiseshell's tarsal hairs are light-coloured.

Biology

The adult insect (imago) over-winters in dry dark places, such as hollow trees or out buildings. In late February or early March the butterflies emerge and mate. The females lay their pale green eggs (ova) in a continuous band around the upper twigs of elm (Ulmus spp.), sallow (Salix caprea and Salix viminalis), pear (Pyrus spp.), Malus, Sorbus, Crataegus, Populus, and Prunus spp. trees.

The caterpillars (larvae) are gregarious, and systematically strip the topmost twigs of the tree bare. They seem to have little defence against predation by birds. It is possible that their decline and extinction in the British Isles (late 1970s) was owing to the loss of predatory birds, which previously had preyed upon smaller birds if they strayed to the tops of these trees.

The full-grown larva spins a silk girdle around a twig further down the tree, and hangs from this by means of hooks (cremaster) at its rear end, to pupate. The chrysalis (pupa) is greyish brown with a slight silvery sheen. The species is univoltine, i.e. there is only one generation per year, the imagines emerging in July and August seek out sources high in sugar on which to feed. Tree sap and fermenting fruit are particularly popular.

References

External links

 de Poitou-Charentes
 Lepiforum.de

Nymphalis
Butterflies of Africa
Butterflies of Asia
Butterflies of Europe
Butterflies described in 1758
Taxa named by Carl Linnaeus
Lepidoptera of Cape Verde